Kleingœft is a commune in the Bas-Rhin department in Grand Est in north-eastern France.

Geography
Surrounding communes are Wolschheim and Maennolsheim to the northeast; Westhouse-Marmoutier to the southeast; and Lochwiller to the west.

Landmarks
Chapel of Betbur
Constructed in the twelfth century, the chapel was originally the parish church of Betbur. Betbur was destroyed during or before the German Peasants' War, and a new village was constructed nearby on the site of what is now known as Kleingœft.   The chapel retained its role as a parish church, now being the parish church of Kleingœft, its cemetery being the Kleingœft village cemetery.  Later a new larger church was built in the centre of Kleingœft, but the Chapel of Betbur is still open and can be visited:  occasionally religious services are still celebrated in it.

See also
 Communes of the Bas-Rhin department

References

Communes of Bas-Rhin
Bas-Rhin communes articles needing translation from French Wikipedia